Sergey Kornilov (born 9 May 1978) is a Russian speed skater. He competed in the men's 500 metres event at the 2006 Winter Olympics.

References

1978 births
Living people
Russian male speed skaters
Olympic speed skaters of Russia
Speed skaters at the 2006 Winter Olympics
Sportspeople from Saint Petersburg